The 1986–87 Louisville Cardinals men's basketball team represented the University of Louisville in the 1986–87 NCAA Division I men's basketball season. The head coach was Denny Crum and the team finished the season with an overall record of 18–14. The team declined an invitation to the 1987 National Invitation Tournament.

Roster

Schedule and results

|-
!colspan=9 style=| Regular Season

|-
!colspan=9 style=| Metro Conference Tournament

References 

Louisville Cardinals men's basketball seasons
Louisville
Louisville Cardinals men's basketball, 1986-87
Louisville Cardinals men's basketball, 1986-87